Collingwood Airport  is a medium-sized registered aerodrome located  southeast of Collingwood, Ontario, Canada,  west of Barrie and  north of Toronto. It is located in the township of Clearview, near Wasaga Beach and the ski hills of Blue Mountain.

The aerodrome is listed by Nav Canada as being an airport of entry and the Canada Border Services Agency agents can handle general aviation aircraft with up to 15 occupants.

History 
Runway improvements were made in 2009 and the airport re-opened in January 2010. The Town of Collingwood sold the airport to a private company, Winterland Developments, in 2019 for $4.1 million.

Radio 
The Unicom frequency is 122.85 MHz (limited hours), and includes ARCAL type K lighting.

Passenger operations

Tenants 
 Levaero Aviation
 Big Blue Air
 Macizzle Aero - aircraft maintenance
 Genesis Flight College - commercial pilot diploma program

References

External links
 Collingwood Regional Airport
 Page about this airport on COPA's Places to Fly airport directory
 Macizzle Aero

Registered aerodromes in Ontario
Collingwood, Ontario
Transport in Simcoe County
Buildings and structures in Simcoe County